Greatest Disney TV & Film Hits is a greatest hits compilation of Disney songs performed by actress and singer Christy Carlson Romano. The album primarily contains Romano's songs previously included on various Disney compilation and soundtrack albums. Three new songs are also included: "Dive In", an original recording made specially for the album, "Colors of the Wind", which was later released on Disneymania 3 (2005) and "Could It Be", later released in promotion of Kim Possible Movie: So the Drama and is also included in the 2005 "Kim-Proved" reissue of the Kim Possible soundtrack. In addition, "Dream Vacation" from The Even Stevens Movie (2003), makes its audio recording debut on this release, as that film did not have a commercially released soundtrack. To date, it is the first and only solo album released by Romano.

Track listing

References

2004 EPs
2004 compilation albums
Albums produced by Matthew Gerrard
Christy Carlson Romano albums
Walt Disney Records compilation albums
Walt Disney Records EPs